Heinrich Schodehoet, O.E.S.A. (died 1515) was a Roman Catholic prelate who served as Auxiliary Bishop of Münster (1494-1515) and Auxiliary Bishop of Osnabrück (1494-1515).

Biography
Heinrich Schodehoet was ordained a priest in the Order of Saint Augustine. On 8 Jan 1494, he was appointed during the papacy of Pope Alexander VI as Auxiliary Bishop of Münster,  Auxiliary Bishop of Osnabrück, and Titular Bishop of Tricale. On 12 Jan 1494, he was consecrated bishop. He served as Auxiliary Bishop of Münster and Auxiliary Bishop of Osnabruck until his death in 1515.

References 

15th-century German Roman Catholic bishops
Bishops appointed by Pope Alexander VI
1515 deaths
Augustinian bishops
16th-century German Roman Catholic bishops